Tierra de lobos is a Spanish television series with elements of historical drama, western, romance, adventure, action, comedy and mystery set in late 19th-century Spain. It originally aired from September 2010 to January 2014 on Telecinco.

Premise 
Spain. 1878. After botching a robbery in Portugal, César and Román Bravo (two outlaw brothers) flee from justice and return to the land they were born in to start a new life. But they are rejected by most of the locals, with the exception of Elena.

The powerful and authoritarian local cacique Antonio Lobo (widowed and the father of four sisters: Almudena, Isabel, Nieves and Rosa), attempts to force the Bravo brothers out of the place. But love arises between César and one of Lobo's daughters.

Cast 

Introduced in the second season

Introduced in season 3

Production and release 
The series' creators, Juan Carlos Cueto and Rocío Martínez-Llano, served as executive producers and screenwriters. Marcelo Pacheco was charged with art direction, Federico Jusid with the score, and Pepe Reyes with costume design.

The series was produced by Multipark Ficción and Boomerang TV for Telecinco.
The first episode premiered on Telecinco on 29 September 2010, with roughly 2.6 million viewers and a 15.6% share. The second season was shot in Maderuelo, province of Segovia.

The last episode aired on 15 January 2014, attracting 2,494,000 viewers (13.1% share).

The broadcasting rights for the Americas were purchased by Direct TV whereas Mediaset Italia held the rights in Italy. The lesbian romance between Isabel Lobo and Cristina was censored in the Italian airing on Mediaset's Rete4.

Season 1

Season 2

Season 3

References  
Citations

Bibliography
 

Television shows filmed in Spain
2010 Spanish television series debuts
2014 Spanish television series endings
Television series set in the 1870s
Telecinco network series
Lesbian-related television shows
Spanish-language television shows
2010s Western (genre) television series
Television shows set in Spain
2010s romantic drama television series
Spanish adventure television series
Spanish LGBT-related television shows
2010s Spanish drama television series
Television series by Boomerang TV